Bucculatrix albella is a moth species in the family Bucculatricidae. The species was first described by Henry Tibbats Stainton in 1867, and is found in southern France, Italy and on the Balkan Peninsula.

References

Natural History Museum Lepidoptera generic names catalog

External links
 Images representing Bucculatrix albella  at Consortium for the Barcode of Life

Bucculatricidae
Moths described in 1867
Moths of Europe
Taxa named by Henry Tibbats Stainton
Leaf miners